Platanos College (formerly Stockwell Park High School) is a mixed secondary school located in the Stockwell area of the London Borough of Lambeth, England.

The school was converted to academy status on 1 February 2011, and was previously a foundation school administered by Lambeth London Borough Council. The school continues to coordinate with Lambeth London Borough Council for admissions.

Platanos College offers GCSEs as programmes of study for pupils. The school also offers a grammar school pathway for gifted pupils.

Performance and inspection

In 2019, the school's Progress 8 and Attainment 8 scores at GCSE were both above average.

As of 2021, the school's most recent inspection by Ofsted was in 2014, with a judgement of Outstanding.

References

External links
Platanos College official website

Secondary schools in the London Borough of Lambeth
Academies in the London Borough of Lambeth
Stockwell